Statistics of Empress's Cup in the 1992 season.

Overview
It was contested by 20 teams, and Nikko Securities Dream Ladies won the championship.

Results

1st round
Gifu Ladies FC 0-4 Tasaki Kobe
Toyama Ladies SC 3-1 FC Sera Fuchu
Sapporo Linda 3-2 Ozu High School
Shinko Seiko FC Clair 10-0 Ota Gal

2nd round
Yomiuri Nippon SC Beleza 6-1 Tasaki Kobe
Fujita Tendai SC Mercury 2-0 Ishinomaki Women's Commercial High School
Prima Ham FC Kunoichi 5-0 Nippon Sport Science University
Toyama Ladies SC 0-8 Matsushita Electric LSC Bambina
Nikko Securities Dream Ladies 11-0 Sapporo Linda
Shiroki FC Serena 0-3 Asahi Kokusai Bunnys
Nissan FC 4-0 Takatsuki FC
Shinko Seiko FC Clair 0-1 Suzuyo Shimizu FC Lovely Ladies

Quarterfinals
Yomiuri Nippon SC Beleza 2-1 Fujita Tendai SC Mercury
Prima Ham FC Kunoichi 1-1 (pen 6-5) Matsushita Electric LSC Bambina
Nikko Securities Dream Ladies 7-0 Asahi Kokusai Bunnys
Nissan FC 0-1 Suzuyo Shimizu FC Lovely Ladies

Semifinals
Yomiuri Nippon SC Beleza 1-1 (pen 4-3) Prima Ham FC Kunoichi
Nikko Securities Dream Ladies 3-3 (pen 5-3) Suzuyo Shimizu FC Lovely Ladies

Final
Yomiuri Nippon SC Beleza 0-1 Nikko Securities Dream Ladies
Nikko Securities Dream Ladies won the championship.

References

Empress's Cup
1992 in Japanese women's football